The sylvan hairstreak (Satyrium sylvinus) is a butterfly of the family Lycaenidae. It is found in western North America, from British Columbia south-east to Wyoming, Colorado and New Mexico and south through California to Baja California Norte, Mexico.

The wingspan is 25–30 mm. There are specimens with or without tails. The upperside is grey-brown or reddish with a blue sheen. The hindwings have a small orange patch at the lower edge. Females have a yellowish tinge. The underside is pale grey to white. There is a postmarginal band of small black dots. Some individuals may have only a few spots. There is also a yellow to red spot at the lower edge of the hindwing. Adults are on wing from May to August in one generation per year. They feed on the nectar of various flowers, including milkweed and Indian hemp.

The larvae feed on the leaves of Salix species. The species overwinters as an egg.

Subspecies
Listed alphabetically.
S. s. desertorum (Grinnell, 1917) (California)
S. s. dryope (Edwards, 1870) (California)
S. s. itys (Edwards, 1882) (Arizona)
S. s. nootka Fisher, 1998 (British Columbia)
S. s. megapallidum Austin, 1998 (Nevada)
S. s. putnami (H. Edwards, 1877) (Utah)
S. s. sylvinus (California)

References

External links
Sylvan Hairstreak, Butterflies of Canada

Butterflies described in 1852
Satyrium (butterfly)